Allan Albert 'Bert' Worner (18 September 1929 – 2 September 2012) was an Australian rules footballer who played with Geelong in the VFL during the early 1950s.

Worner usually played on the half back flank but was also seen on the wing and in the centre. Recruited from Swan Hill, he was a premiership player in 1951 and 1952.

References

External links

1929 births
Australian rules footballers from Victoria (Australia)
Geelong Football Club players
Geelong Football Club Premiership players
2012 deaths
Two-time VFL/AFL Premiership players